Tehace is a Polish death metal band from Wejherowo.

History 
Tehace was founded in 1999. One year later, the group released their first bootleg titled Live`n`Evil. Later in 2001, their debut promo Zymatic Disease Of Human Believes was published. It consisted of four original compositions and Morbid Angel cover. In 2002 the band became supported by Apocalypse Prod., which resulted on Tehace's shows on Winter Crusade Tour 2002  and Yattering`s Genocide Tour in 2003.

During 2003-2005 the band was composing material on their debut full-length album. Period from April to November 2005 was spent on recording Zipped Noise From Hell. It contains 10 tracks, all composed by Krzysztof Gordziej, Sebastian Kielas, Omar Al-Kilani and Radosław Szczepański (drummer of Calm Hatchery). Album was mixed by Piotr Łukaszewski in RG Studio in Gdańsk. Album was released by Mystic Productions in August 2006, gaining many positive reviews.

In 2010 the group took part in tour titled Beware Of Your Neck Tour 2010 in Poland, Czech Republic and Slovakia together with: Sadist, Cerebrum, Virgin Snatch, Crionics and Saratan. Michał Mezger from Struggle With God replaced Omar Al-Kilani for the period of tour.

Line-up 

 Current members 
 Krzysztof Gordziej - guitar, vocals (2000-)
 Omar Al-Kilani - guitar, backing vocals (2009-) 
 Kacper Sarnatowicz - bass (2013-)
 Łukasz Śmigiel - drums (2013-)
 
 Past & Live Members
 Sebastian Kielas - bass guitar (2000-2008, 2010-2013)
 Jacek Góraj - guitar (2000-2009)
 Radosław Szczepański - drums 
 Piotr Hauzer - guitar (2009)
 Adam Książek - bass (2009-2010)
 Michał Dobrzański - drums (2009)

Discography 
 Live'n'evil (2000, demo, independent release)
 Zymatic Disease of Human Believes (2001, demo, independent release)
 Confusion in Chaos / Zymatic Disease of Human Believes (2001, Apocalypse Production, split with Silent Confusion)
 Zipped Noise from Hell (2006, Mystic Production)
 Yearing for the Slime (2014, MMM Records)

References

External links 
 Official Website of Tehace

Polish death metal musical groups
Mystic Production artists
Musical quartets